Topgrade is a multi-platform learning system run by Sureware Ltd. It was originally launched as an iOS app, called Revision Quiz Maker, but subsequently expanded to include an Android app and an online site, and rebranded as Topgrade.

Functionality
As a learning environment, Topgrade lets registered users create quizzes and flashcards specific to their own courses as well as playing quizzes made by others. Learning resources can be shared across Apple, Android and Windows devices by using the online site.

Development
A new native Android quiz maker app was released on 24 January 2016. An Android course maker app was released on 12 December 2017 with the iOS equivalent due for release in 2018.

Media reception
APPEd Review gave the application mostly positive ratings for "Efficiency" and "Design", but criticized several aspects of its "Functionality". In 2015, SensorTower reported an average users satisfaction rating of 4.5/5 stars for the iOS App.

See also
 Online Quiz

References

External links
 

Internet properties established in 2013
British educational websites